Ata Messan Ajavon Zeus is a Togolese politician, and has been the chairman of the Save Togo Collective since the party was founded.

References

Living people
Members of the National Assembly (Togo)
Let's Save Togo Collective politicians
Year of birth missing (living people)
21st-century Togolese people